FFAS Senior League is the top division of the Football Federation American Samoa in American Samoa and is played on an amateur basis.

In 2009, the last two rounds of the league and the play-offs were cancelled because the only available pitch in Pago Pago was badly damaged in the 2009 Samoa earthquake and tsunami. During the 2010 season, all matches were held at the Kananafou Theological Seminary College Sports Field as the stadium usually used in Pago Pago was still undergoing repairs.

Clubs
These are the teams for the 2017 season.
Black Roses
Green Bay
Ilaoa and To'omata
Lion Heart
Pago Youth 
PanSa East
Royal Puma
Tafuna Jets
Taputimu Youth
Utulei Youth
Vaiala Tongan

Winners
Past winners of the league are:

Performances

 Title Shared.

Top scorers

References

External links
League at FIFA
League at soccerway.com
Football Federation American Samoa

 
1
Amer